Teahan, also spelt Teehan, is a surname from Ireland. Notable people with the surname include:

 Ciarán Teehan (born 1999), Irish darts player
 Kathleen Teahan (born 1947), American teacher and politician
 Terence Teahan (1905–1989), Irish musician and composer

Surnames of Irish origin
Anglicised Irish-language surnames